William Kirk may refer to:

William Arthur Kirk, American mathematician
William Astor Kirk, (1922–2011), American civil rights activist and author
William F. Kirk, (1877–1927), American baseball writer and poet
Billy Kirk, rugby league footballer of the 1930s for England, and Warrington
William Kirk (cricketer), (1866–1904), English cricketer
William L. Kirk, (1932–2017), American air force officer
William Umpleby Kirk, (1843–1928), photographer
Bill Kirk (1934–2009), American baseball player
William Kirk (MP), (1795–1870), Member of the UK Parliament for Newry
William Kirke, MP for Clitheroe
Will Kirk, Furniture restorer The Repair Shop